Hartwig Gauder (10 November 1954 – 22 April 2020) was a German race walker who won a gold medal in the Men's 50 kilometres walk at the 1980 Summer Olympics in Moscow.

Born in West Germany, his family moved to East Germany in 1960 when they inherited property at Ilmenau. Gauder thus competed for East Germany.

In 1996 Gauder started suffering from a virus infection of his heart. After living with an artificial heart for several months, he received a heart transplant. He subsequently took part in the New York Marathon several times. Being classified as a disabled participant due to his transplant, he was once disqualified for being too fast as there was a minimum time, which he underran.

His recovery from almost dying to returning into a normal life was covered in a documentary shown on German documentary channel Phoenix.

Gauder died while undergoing dialysis on 22 April 2020, aged 65. The cause of death was a heart attack complicated by kidney failure.

International competitions
Olympic Games
1980 Moscow – gold
1988 Seoul – bronze
World Championships
1987 Rome – gold
1991 Tokyo – bronze
European Championships
1986 Stuttgart – gold
1990 Split – bronze

References

Sporting Heroes

External links

 
 
 

1954 births
2020 deaths
People from Vaihingen an der Enz
Sportspeople from Stuttgart (region)
East German male racewalkers
German male racewalkers
Olympic athletes of East Germany
Olympic athletes of Germany
Athletes (track and field) at the 1980 Summer Olympics
Athletes (track and field) at the 1988 Summer Olympics
Athletes (track and field) at the 1992 Summer Olympics
World Athletics Championships athletes for East Germany
World Athletics Championships athletes for Germany
Heart transplant recipients
Olympic gold medalists for East Germany
Olympic bronze medalists for East Germany
World Athletics Championships medalists
European Athletics Championships medalists
Medalists at the 1980 Summer Olympics
Medalists at the 1988 Summer Olympics
Olympic gold medalists in athletics (track and field)
Olympic bronze medalists in athletics (track and field)
Recipients of the Patriotic Order of Merit in gold
World Athletics Race Walking Team Championships winners
World Athletics Championships winners